Lauren Gottlieb (born June 8, 1988) is an American dancer and actress who works mainly in the Indian film industry. She was a contestant on the third season of the reality dance competition So You Think You Can Dance and played the lead role in the 2013 Indian dance film ABCD: Any Body Can Dance. She was the runner up in the sixth season of popular Indian television dance show Jhalak Dikhhla Jaa with choreographer and partner Punit Pathak in 2013. Two years later, she also judged the eighth season of the show. She has also Appeared In The Music Video Of Harrdy Sandhu "She Dance Like".

Dance career
Gottlieb assisted choreographer Tyce Diorio during the second season of So You Think You Can Dance in 2004. In 2005, Gottlieb participated in season three of So You Think You Can Dance (2005) as a contestant. She made it to the final six contestants but struck out in the end. Once the season was over, Gottlieb assisted Tyce Diorio, Tabitha and Napoleon D'umo, and Mia Michaels during seasons four, five, and six. She also traveled on the season five audition tour as the choreographer for the "choreography round" of auditions. She returned as an "All-Star" dancer for seasons seven (2010), eight (2011), and nine (2012).

Between seasons on the show, Gottlieb performed with artists such as Rihanna, Mariah Carey, Britney Spears, Shakira, Sean Kingston, Carrie Underwood, Willow Smith, and Enrique Iglesias. She even worked with Tom Cruise, Katie Holmes, and Tobey Maguire. She appeared as a dancer in the television show Glee (2009) and in the movies Disaster Movie (2008), Hannah Montana: The Movie (2009), and Bring It On: Fight to the Finish (2009).

Gottlieb appeared in India's version of Dancing With the Stars called Jhalak Dikhla Jaa (Season 6, 2013) and was the runner-up with choreo-partner Punit Pathak. In 2014, she participated in Jhalak Dikhla Jaa (Season 7) with Salman Yusuff Khan as a "Challenge Setter".

Acting career
Gottlieb's first shot at acting was on the television show Ghost Whisperer (2005). After Ghost Whisperer, she guest starred in Make It or Break It (2009), CSI: Crime Scene Investigation, and Alvin and the Chipmunks: Chipwrecked (2011). Gottlieb played the lead female role in the Indian 3D dance film ABCD: Any Body Can Dance (2013), directed by Remo D'Souza. Prior to filming, Gottlieb moved to India in March 2012 and spent three months learning Hindi and Bollywood dance techniques. The film was shot in Mumbai where she played the role of dancer Rhea, a student of Vishnu (Prabhudheva). It featured Kay Kay Menon, and Ganesh Acharya as well as dancers Salman Yusuff Khan, Dharmesh Yelande and Punit Pathak from the television show Dance India Dance. Gottlieb played the Pakistani agent Shazia Ansari in the black comedy Welcome 2 Karachi (2015).

Filmography

Films

Television

Music Videos

Short Film

References

External links

Living people
1988 births
Actresses from Scottsdale, Arizona
Actresses from Arizona
Dancers from Arizona
American contemporary dancers
American female dancers
American film actresses
American television actresses
American expatriate actresses in India
Actresses in Hindi cinema
Actresses in Punjabi cinema
So You Think You Can Dance (American TV series) contestants
Reality dancing competition contestants
21st-century American dancers
21st-century American actresses